In mathematics, Buffon's needle problem is a question first posed in the 18th century by Georges-Louis Leclerc, Comte de Buffon:

Suppose we have a floor made of parallel strips of wood, each the same width, and we drop a needle onto the floor. What is the probability that the needle will lie across a line between two strips?

Buffon's needle was the earliest problem in geometric probability to be solved; it can be solved using integral geometry. The solution for the sought probability p, in the case where the needle length ℓ is not greater than the width t of the strips, is

This can be used to design a Monte Carlo method for approximating the number , although that was not the original motivation for de Buffon's question.

Solution 
The problem in more mathematical terms is: Given a needle of length  dropped on a plane ruled with parallel lines t units apart, what is the probability that the needle will lie across a line upon landing?

Let x be the distance from the center of the needle to the closest parallel line, and let θ be the acute angle between the needle and one of the parallel lines.

The uniform probability density function of x between 0 and t/2 is

Here, x = 0 represents a needle that is centered directly on a line, and x = t/2 represents a needle that is perfectly centered between two lines. The uniform PDF assumes the needle is equally likely to fall anywhere in this range, but could not fall outside of it.

The uniform probability density function of θ between 0 and /2 is

Here, θ = 0 radians represents a needle that is parallel to the marked lines, and θ = /2 radians represents a needle that is perpendicular to the marked lines. Any angle within this range is assumed an equally likely outcome.

The two random variables, x and θ, are independent, so the joint probability density function is the product

The needle crosses a line if

Now there are two cases.

Case 1: Short needle 
Integrating the joint probability density function gives the probability that the needle will cross a line:

Case 2: Long needle 
Suppose . In this case, integrating the joint probability density function, we obtain:

Thus, performing the above integration, we see that, when , the probability that the needle will cross a line is

or

In the second expression, the first term represents the probability of the angle of the needle being such that it will always cross at least one line. The right term represents the probability that, the needle falls at an angle where its position matters, and it crosses the line.

Alternatively notice that whenever  has a value such that , that is, in the range  the probability of crossing is the same as in the short needle case. However if , that is,  the probability is constant and is equal to 1.

Using elementary calculus 
The following solution for the "short needle" case, while equivalent to the one above, has a more visual flavor, and avoids iterated integrals.

Looking at the illustration in the above section, it is apparent that the needle can cross a line if the center of the needle is within  units of either side of the strip. Adding  from both sides and dividing by the whole width , we obtain 

Now, we assume that the center is within reach of the edge of the strip, and calculate . To simplify the calculation, we can assume that .

Let x and θ be as in the illustration in this section. Placing a needle's center at x, the needle will cross the vertical axis if it falls within a range of 2θ radians, out of  radians of possible orientations. This represents the gray area to the left of x in the figure. For a fixed x, we can express θ as a function of x: . Now we can let x move from 0 to 1, and integrate:

Multiplying both results, we obtain , as above.

There is an even more elegant and simple method of calculating the "short needle case".

  as above.

Without integrals 
The short-needle problem can also be solved without any integration, in a way that explains the formula for p from the geometric fact that a circle of diameter t will cross the distance t strips always (i.e. with probability 1) in exactly two spots. This solution was given by Joseph-Émile Barbier in 1860 and is also referred to as "Buffon's noodle".

Estimating  

In the first, simpler case above, the formula obtained for the probability  can be rearranged to  Thus, if we conduct an experiment to estimate , we will also have an estimate for .

Suppose we drop n needles and find that h of those needles are crossing lines, so  is approximated by the fraction . This leads to the formula:

In 1901, Italian mathematician Mario Lazzarini performed Buffon's needle experiment.

Lazzarini chose needles whose length was 5/6 of the width of the strips of wood. Thus if one were to drop n needles and get x crossings, one would estimate  as:So if Lazzarini was aiming for the result 355/113, he needed n and x such that:or equivalently,
To do this, one should pick n as a multiple of 213, because then  is an integer; one then drops n needles, and hopes for exactly  successes.
If one drops 213 needles and happens to get 113 successes, then one can triumphantly report an estimate of  accurate to six decimal places.  If not,  one can just do  213 more trials and hope  for  a total of 226 successes; if not, just repeat as necessary.    Lazzarini performed 3408 = 213 · 16 trials, making it seem likely that this is the strategy he used to obtain his "estimate."

The above description of strategy might even be considered charitable to Lazzarini. A statistical analysis of intermediate results he reported for fewer tosses leads to a very low probability of achieving such close agreement to the expected value all through the experiment. This makes it very possible that the "experiment" itself was never physically performed, but based on numbers concocted from imagination to match statistical expectations, but too well, as it turns out.

Dutch science journalist Hans van Maanen argues, however, that Lazzarini's article was never meant to be taken too seriously as it would have been pretty obvious for the readers of the magazine (aimed at school teachers) that the apparatus that Lazzarini said to have built cannot possibly work as described.

Laplace's Extension (Short Needle Case)
Now consider the case where the plane contains two sets of parallel lines orthogonal to one another, creating a standard perpendicular grid. We aim to find the probability that the needle intersects at least one line on the grid. Since this is the short needle case, . Let  mark the coordinates of the needle's midpoint and let  mark the angle formed by the needle and the x-axis. Similar to the examples described above, we consider  to be independent uniform random variables over the ranges .

To solve such a problem, we first compute the probability that the needle crosses no lines, and then we take its compliment. We compute this first probability by determining the volume of the domain where the needle crosses no lines and then divide that by the volume of all possibilities, . We can easily see that .

Now let  be the volume of possibilities where the needle does not intersect any line. 
Developed by J.V. Uspensky ,

where  is the region where the needle does not intersect any line given an angle . To determine , let's first look at the case for the horizontal edges of the bounding rectangle. Equivalently, for the vertical edges with length , we have . The  accounts for the cases where  is positive or negative. Taking the positive case and then adding the absolute value signs in the final answer for generality, we get

.

Now we can compute the following integral: 

.

Thus, the probability that the needle does not intersect any line is

 

And finally, if we want to calculate the probability, that the needle does intersect at least one line, we need to subtract the above result from 1 to compute its compliment, yielding

.

See also 
Bertrand paradox (probability)

References

Bibliography 
 
 
 
 
 Schroeder, L. (1974). "Buffon's needle problem: An exciting application of many mathematical concepts". Mathematics Teacher, 67 (2), 183–6.
 Uspensky, James Victor. "Introduction to mathematical probability." (1937).

External links 

 Buffon's Needle Problem at cut-the-knot
 Math Surprises: Buffon's Noodle at cut-the-knot
 MSTE: Buffon's Needle
 Buffon's Needle Java Applet
 Estimating PI Visualization (Flash)
 Buffon's needle: fun and fundamentals (presentation) at slideshare
 Animations for the Simulation of Buffon's Needle by Yihui Xie using the R package animation
 3D Physical Animation by Jeffrey Ventrella
 

Applied probability
Integral geometry
Probability problems